Milk roll (also known as Blackpool Roll) is a soft, round type of British bread traditionally associated with the town of Blackpool, Lancashire. It is made using milk instead of water, as well as white flour, yeast, and sugar.

Milk roll is soft and light-textured, with a soft crust.

The exact origin of milk breads is unclear. There is evidence from a British baker, Robert Clarke, that knowledge of milk bread in the United Kingdom dates back to 1862 and came from Japan, shortly after the isolationist country had been forced open to the rest of the world.

Shape and structure 
Milk rolls are baked in a two-part cylindrical mould with ridges to indicate slice-cutting positions. Warburtons bakery distribute a pre-sliced version nationwide. The soft crust is caused by steam being trapped within the mould and because no surface is directly exposed and it is steam cooked, the crust is unusually soft.

See also 
 List of breads

References 

Breads
Milk dishes